Diyorakhon Khabibullaeva (born 15 September 1999) is an Uzbekistani footballer who plays as a forward for Women's Championship club Sogdiana and the Uzbekistan women's national team.

International goals

See also
List of Uzbekistan women's international footballers

References 

1999 births
Living people
Women's association football forwards
Uzbekistani women's footballers
People from Sirdaryo Region
Uzbekistan women's international footballers